Ix Shen (formerly ; born 11 March 1972), also known as Shen Qing, is a Singaporean former television actor, now working in film production.

Career 
Shen began his acting career in TCS (now Mediacorp) in 1995 after emerging the male winner of Star Search, a televised talent search competition. In 2000, he joined SPH MediaWorks not long after the latter was established. In late 2004 SPH MediaWorks was merged into MediaCorp and Shen was one of the 20 artistes who were transferred back to MediaCorp.

The 2007 television series Honour and Passion, produced by MediaCorp Channel 8 and sponsored by Singapore's Ministry of Defence (MINDEF), featured Shen in the role of a terrorist named Wu Chengyi, who holds the lives of Singaporeans to ransom. Metamorphosis, another MediaCorp Channel 8 television series aired in 2007, also featured Shen as being involved in terrorism activities.

In 2009, he starred in 2 ntv7 shows: Lion Hearts and My Destiny which was shown in Malaysia. Shen had a small role in the 2010 film Old Cow Vs Tender Grass.

In 2011, Shen returned to local screens where he starred in the series The Oath alongside Christopher Lee, Jesseca Liu and Ann Kok. As of 2017, The Oath is Shen's last television role, but he has not ruled out a return to television.

It was reported by Shin Min Daily News in 2017 that Shen has removed the "" from his Chinese name, after he relocated to China. He served as an executive director for the Chinese film Wolf Warrior 2.

Personal life 
Shen married his Ukrainian wife, a traditional Chinese medicine practitioner, in 2015 and moved to Kyiv, Ukraine in 2021. When the 2022 Russian invasion of Ukraine first started, he did not intend to leave the city along with his family. However, as the fighting in Kyiv intensified, he and his wife decided to evacuate westward from Kyiv, arriving at Lviv on 10 March 2022. The couple then proceeded to cross into Poland and travelled to Warsaw. In April 2022, Shen later volunteered and returned to Ukraine to help distribute humanitarian aid, and had compared the Bucha massacre, in which Ukrainian civilians of the city was killed, tortured and raped by the then occupying Russian troops, to Sook Ching, a mass killing of civilians suspected to be anti-Japanese in Singapore by Japanese occupation troops during World War II.

Filmography

Achievements

References 

Singaporean male television actors
Living people
1972 births